Harry Webb may refer to:

Harry S. Webb (1892–1959), American film director
Harry Webb (communist) (1889–1962), British communist activist
Harry Webb (politician) (1908–2000), Australian politician
Harri Webb (1920–1994), Anglo-Welsh poet
Cliff Richard (Harry Rodger Webb, born 1940), British pop singer

See also
Harold Webbe (1885–1965), British politician
Henry Webb (disambiguation)